Zack Cohen (Born Zachary Cohen, June 24) is the CEO of and co-owner of Fox Fuse. Cohen oversees distribution, licensing, bookings and artist management for Fox Fuse.  His partner at Fox Fuse is Rhona Fox.

Cohen manages artist Stein, and has worked on several projects from reggae icon Shaggy to soca star Farmer Nappy, for the New York-based Fox Fuse.

Cohen also handles Music Business Affairs for various production houses across the Caribbean and has worked on numerous albums in that capacity, as well as providing A&R and Art Direction services.

In July 2015, Cohen was interviewed by Billboard in an article on the international success of pop star Rihanna and the ensuing growth of Caribbean music, especially in her homeland of Barbados. Fox Fuse is cited in the piece as being the "world’s largest distributor of Cropover music." In August 2015, the Daily News (New York) stated that Fox Fuse "is currently the world’s largest music label for contemporary soca music."

Early career
Cohen previously served as the Licensing Manager at VP Records, representing both the Greensleeves Records and VP Records catalogs. He was the first Licensing Manager at VP Records. He also served as A&R of 'Soca Gold: The Ultimate Collection,' released by VP Records on September 13, 2011.

References

Living people
Year of birth missing (living people)